Antonio Di Gaudio (born 16 August 1989) is an Italian footballer who plays as a winger for  club Avellino.

Career
Born in Palermo, Di Gaudio made his senior debut with Virtus Castelfranco in Serie D. After netting ten times in the 2009–10 season, he joined Carpi.

On 24 August 2013, Di Gaudio made his Serie B debut, starting in a 0–1 loss at Ternana; he scored his first goal on 30 November, his side's last of a 2–4 loss at Pescara.

On 23 January 2019, he joined Hellas Verona on loan with an obligation to buy.

On 31 January 2020, he was loaned to Spezia.

On 1 February 2021 he moved to Chievo on a 6-month contract with an extension option.

On 31 August 2021 he signed a two-year contract with Avellino.

References

External links

1989 births
Living people
Footballers from Palermo
Italian footballers
Association football wingers
Serie A players
Serie B players
Serie C players
Lega Pro Seconda Divisione players
A.C. Carpi players
Parma Calcio 1913 players
Hellas Verona F.C. players
Spezia Calcio players
A.C. ChievoVerona players
U.S. Avellino 1912 players